The 1993 Northern Iowa Panthers football team represented the University of Northern Iowa as a member of the Gateway Football Conference during the 1993 NCAA Division I-AA football season. Led by fifth-year head coach Terry Allen, the Panthers compiled an overall record of 8–4 with a mark of 5–1 in conference play, winning the Gateway title for the fourth consecutive season. Northern Iowa advanced to the NCAA Division I-AA Football Championship playoffs, where they lost in the first round to Boston University. Panthers offense scored 350 points while the defense allowed 238 points. Quarterback Kurt Warner was in his senior season with the Panthers.

Schedule

Roster

Awards and honors

Gateway First Team
Andre Allen, LB
Matt Harken, TE
John Herrin, OT
Tony Monroe, DL
Tim Mosley, WR/P
Donald Mumma, OC
Kurt Warner, QB

Gateway Second Team
Myron Glass, DB
Michael Hudnutt, OG
Jason McCleary, DB
Jeff Stovall, RB
Joseph Wallace, DB

Gateway Honorable Mention
Todd Harrington, DB
D. Minnieweather, LB
Casey Smith, DL
Paul Wolf, LB

Gateway Offensive Player of the Year
Kurt Warner, QB

Gateway Defensive Player of the Year
Andre Allen, LB

Gateway Coach of the Year
Terry Allen

Gateway Players of the Week
LB Andre Allen (1)
RS Jason McCleary (1)
WR Tim Mosley (2)
OC D.J. Mumma (2)
RB Jeff Stovall (1)
QB Kurt Warner (2)

Team players in the NFL
 Quarterback Kurt Warner went on to a career in the National Football League (NFL), playing for the St. Louis Rams, New York Giants, and Arizona Cardinals.

References

Northern Iowa
Northern Iowa Panthers football seasons
Missouri Valley Football Conference champion seasons
Northern Iowa Panthers football